Stewart Ryrie may refer to:
 Stewart Ryrie (colonial settler) (1778–1852), colonial settler of New South Wales
 Stewart Ryrie, Junior (1812–1882), his son, Scottish-born Australian pastoralist, surveyor and settle